Life in Flight is a 2008 romantic comedy-drama film written and directed by Tracey Hecht. Patrick Wilson stars as Will Sargent, an architect who begins to question the perfect life he has constructed for himself and his family when he meets urban designer Kate Voss (Lynn Collins). Amy Smart co-stars. It premiered at the Tribeca Film Festival on April 27, 2008, and was later released in the United States on November 30, 2010 by IFC Films.

Plot

Will Sargent (Wilson) is an up-and-coming New York City architect, managing an important project and in the midst of negotiations to join an important firm. Will's wife Catherine (Smart) is riding his coattails, managing their social success. Their seven-year-old son, Nate (Rosseljong) feels the effects of their success when his activities are often pushed to the sidelines in light of the important deal his father is negotiating.

Will meets Kate Voss (Collins), a small-space designer, through mutual friends. Will has seen her work at his son's school, and encourages her to drop off her portfolio for him to recommend for a job he is connected with. The two meet on several occasions at several social functions and to discuss Kate's work, all the while Will neglects to mention that he is married.

Kate calls Will's home number by mistake, and speaks with his wife who encourages her to drop off her work at their house. When Kate drops by, she is astonished to find out not only is it Will's house and not a work location, but that he is married.

Cast
 Patrick Wilson as Will Sargent
 Amy Smart as Catherine Sargent
 Lynn Collins as Kate Voss
 Frederick Weller as Kit
 Monique Gabriela Curnen as Janey
 Zak Orth as Josh
 Rashida Jones as Nina
 Janet Zarish as Pamela
 Stephanie Szostak as Alex
 Troy Britton Johnson as Stewart
 Kevin Rosseljong as Nate Sargent
 Quincy Tyler Bernstine as Cali
 Jennifer Smolos as Cynthia
 Tim Miller as City Planning Head
 Alix Elias as Waitress
 Kelly Nyks as Aidan

Release
The film premiered as an official selection at the 2008 Tribeca Film Festival. It was released almost three years later in the United States, on November 30, 2010, by IFC Films.

References

External links
 

2008 films
2008 romantic comedy-drama films
American romantic comedy-drama films
2008 drama films
2000s English-language films
2000s American films
Films scored by Anton Sanko